Rıza Kocaoğlu (born March 19, 1979) is a Turkish actor. Born and raised in İzmir, he is mainly known for his role as Ali in the television series Kuzey Güney.

Life 
His maternal family is of Turkish descent who immigrated from Thessaloniki, Ottoman Empire (nowadays in Greece). His paternal family is of Turkish and Armenian descents from Kars and Yerevan. His sister, Gözde Kocaoğlu, is also an actress. He is a graduate of the theater department at Dokuz Eylül University and has worked in cinema since 2001. On 25 January 2013, 30 actors, including Rıza Kocaoğlu, were taken into custody for a drugs probe by Istanbul's narcotics police.

Filmography

References

1979 births
Living people
Dokuz Eylül University alumni
Actors from İzmir
Turkish male film actors
Turkish male television actors